CSLA may refer to:

 California School Library Association
 Certified Student Loan Advisor
 Component-based Scalable Logical Architecture
 Community Sports Leader Award
 Czechoslovak People's Army
 Canadian Society of Landscape Architects / L'Association des Architectes Paysagistes du Canada
 Confederación Sindical Latinoamericana